Filopaludina miveruensis is a species of large freshwater snail with a gill and an operculum, an aquatic gastropod mollusk in the family Viviparidae.

Distribution 
This species has been reported from Vietnam, but there are doubts about the validity of this species. It may in fact be the African species Bellamya mweruensis.

References

Viviparidae